Bruno Capinan (Brazilian; born 18 October 1984) is a singer/songwriter. They have been a Canadian citizen since 2014, and currently reside in the city of Toronto. They first came to international attention in 2010, with their debut release Gozo. They have released three records, with their latest, 2016's Divina Graça generating widespread recognition, including from British newspaper The Guardian. which described their voice as "acrobatic, sensual, both angelic and profane" and France's Libération calling it a "wickedly beautiful album". In 2017, they began collaborating with Japanese composer Jun Miyake and appeared on his 2018 release Lost Memory Theatre-act 3 as both lyricist and vocalist on the tracks "Pontual" and "Alta Maré".

Their album Real was considered one of the 25 best Brazilian albums of the second half of 2019 by the São Paulo Association of Art Critics.

Personal life 
Capinan identifies as non-binary. They use they/them pronouns.

Discography

Studio albums 
 Gozo (2010)
 Tudo Está Dito (2014)
 Divina Graça (2016)

References

External links
 http://www.brunocapinan.com

1981 births
Living people
Brazilian non-binary people
Brazilian LGBT singers
Non-binary singers
21st-century Brazilian singers